They Like 'Em Rough is a 1922 silent comedy film directed by Harry Beaumont and starring Viola Dana, W.E. Lawrence and Hardee Kirkland.

Cast
 Viola Dana as Katherine
 W.E. Lawrence as Richard Wells Jr. 
 Hardee Kirkland as Richard Wells Sr.
 Myrtle Rishell as Mrs. Wells 
 Colin Kenny as Waddie
 Steve Murphy as Grogan
 Walter Rodgers as Kelly
 Burton Law as La Grande
 Bradley Ward as Pete 
 Knute Erickson as Dr. Curtis
 Elsa Lorimer as Mrs. Curtis

References

Bibliography
James Robert Parish & Michael R. Pitts. Film directors: a guide to their American films. Scarecrow Press, 1974.

External links
 

1922 films
1922 comedy films
1920s English-language films
American silent feature films
Silent American comedy films
American black-and-white films
Films directed by Harry Beaumont
Metro Pictures films
1920s American films